Beta Reticuli (Beta Ret, β Reticuli, β Ret) is binary star system in southern constellation of Reticulum. It is visible to the naked eye with an apparent visual magnitude of +3.84. Based upon an annual parallax shift of 33.49 mas, it is located some 97 light years from the Sun.

This is a single-lined spectroscopic binary with an orbital period of 5.25 years and an eccentricity of 0.33. The primary, component A, is an evolved K-type giant star with a stellar classification of K0 IVSB:. It is between 5 and 6 billion years old, with 1.2 times the mass of the Sun and 9.3 times the Sun's radius. The companion, component B, is most likely a red dwarf with a classification in the range M0–M4.

During the mid-20th century, the Dutch-American astronomer Willem Jacob Luyten proposed that the G3V star HD 24293 formed a third component of this system, based upon similar proper motions. However, this was subsequently ruled out based on more accurate measurements, since their actual distances, radial velocities, and proper motions do not match.

Beta Reticuli is moving through the Galaxy at a speed of 69.2 km/s relative to the Sun. Its projected Galactic orbit carries it between 10,100 and 24,200 light years from the center of the Galaxy. Beta Reticuli came closest to the Sun 319,000 years ago when it had brightened to magnitude 2.98 from a distance of 67 light years.

Naming

References

K-type giants
M-type main-sequence stars
Spectroscopic binaries
Reticuli, Beta
Reticulum (constellation)
023817
017440
1175
Durchmusterung objects